AlphaCom is an operator of for-profit virtual schools based in Carmel, Indiana. The schools, including Indiana Virtual School, have been criticized for low graduation rates and high student-teacher ratios. This is the lowest graduation rate of any high school in the state.

References

Companies based in Indianapolis